The Australian Cricket Society is a fraternity of cricket lovers with branches in New South Wales, Queensland, South Australia and Tasmania. It was established in Melbourne, Victoria, in 1967.  Ricky Ponting serves as patron.

Activities 
Guest speakers at its Annual Dinners come from the 'Who's Who' of the cricketing world. Down through the years, they've included Sir Donald Bradman, Lindsay Hassett, Bill Lawry and more recently, Ian Healy, Dean Jones, Damien Fleming, Justin Langer and Barry Richards. The Society supports youth and grassroots cricket through its Young Cricketer (male and female) and sponsorship of emerging talent through the Elite Cricket Academy.

Publications 
Each summer the Society publishes its flagship magazine, Pavilion, edited by Ken Piesse - a 48-page production with articles by renowned cricket writers and a forum for members and friends. The Cricket Society Scoresheet quarterly news bulletin keeps members informed of upcoming events.

Jack Pollard Trophy
In order to encourage cricket writing in Australia, in 1984 Jack Pollard donated a trophy to be awarded by the Australian Cricket Society to the author of the best Australian cricket book published over the previous 12 months. It is sometimes called the Jack Pollard Literary Award.

NB: The trophy is not awarded every year.

Veterans cricket 
The ACS Melbourne Wandering XI plays up to 20 friendlies each season against like-minded players from the MCC XXIX Club, Lords Taverners and the Supreme Court of Victoria. The Society is a founding member of Veterans Cricket Victoria. fielding Over 60 and 70 year old teams in the Victoria state wide competition and end of season carnival at Echuca. Seventeen ACS players have been chosen to represent Victoria at upcoming Over 60s Australian Over 60s and Over 70s Championships to be held in November 2022. 

The Society has been a regular participant in Golden Oldies, Vintage Cricket carnivals and Exotic Cricket Tours around the world and has hosted like-minded overseas touring teams visiting Australia since 1996.

References

External links 
 

Cricket historians and writers
Clubs and societies in Australia
Sports organizations established in 1967